Ian Vaughan (born 3 July 1961) is an English former professional football defender. He played in the Football League for Rotherham United and Stockport County.

Vaughan was an apprentice with Rotherham United, later turning professional with Rotherham and making his league debut in the 1979–80 season. He played 25 times in the league for Rotherham, scoring a blinding right footed volley in the memorable FA Cup first-round game vs York City during the 1980/1 season.

Vaughan's career highlights at Rotherham included drinking a bottle of beer in celebration of Rotherham's promotion to the Second Division at the close of the 1980–81 season. That same year, Vaughan captained the Rotherham side in a shock 2–1 win over rivals Sheffield Wednesday in the final of the Sheffield & Hallamshire County Cup. 

He also made 6 appearances while on loan to Stockport County, before leaving to join then non-league Burton Albion. He subsequently joined Mossley, playing 11 times in the 1986–87 season before leaving to finish his career with Toddick Town.

References

1961 births
English footballers
Rotherham United F.C. players
Stockport County F.C. players
Burton Albion F.C. players
Mossley A.F.C. players
Matlock Town F.C. players
Living people
Association football central defenders
Footballers from Sheffield
English Football League players